The Pascoag River is a river in the U.S. state of Rhode Island.  It flows approximately 4.5 miles (7 km). There are five dams along the river's length.

Course
The river rises from the various streams that feed the Pascoag Reservoir in Glocester. From the reservoir, the river flows north to Burrillville where it flows into the Clear River in the village of Pascoag.

Crossings
Below is a list of all crossings over the Pascoag River. The list starts at the headwaters and goes downstream.
Glocester
Jackson School House Road
Burrillville
High Street (RI 100)
Sayles Avenue
Bridge Way
Grove Street

Tributaries
The Pascoag River has no named tributaries, however there are many unnamed streams that also feed it.

See also
List of rivers in Rhode Island
Clear River

References

Rivers of Providence County, Rhode Island
Rivers of Rhode Island
Tributaries of Providence River